Dar ul Ihsan railway station is located in Dar ul Ihsan town, Faisalabad district of Punjab province, Pakistan. It was formerly known as Salarwala railway station.

See also
 List of railway stations in Pakistan
 Pakistan Railways

References

External links

Railway stations in Nankana Sahib District
Railway stations on Sangla Hill–Kundian Branch Line
Railway stations on Khanewal–Wazirabad Line